Endorsement (alternatively spelled "indorsement") may refer to a:

 testimonial, a written or spoken statement promoting or advertising a product
 political endorsement, publicly declaring support for a candidate 
 form added to an insurance policy, to modify its terms
 signature on a negotiable instrument, such as a check
 blank endorsement, a signature given without indicating the instrument's payee
 note added to a driver's license, often to record a traffic offense

See also 
 Endorsement test, the separation between state and religion as tested by the United States Supreme Court
 Forged endorsement, a legal description of forged endorsement